Carl William Vandagrift (April 22, 1883 – October 9, 1920) was a Major League Baseball infielder.

External links

1883 births
1920 deaths
Indianapolis Hoosiers players
Baseball players from Illinois
Major League Baseball second basemen
Minor league baseball managers
Clinton Infants players
Springfield Senators players
Lowell Tigers players
Peoria Distillers players
Adrian Yeggs players
Fort Wayne Brakies players
Fort Wayne Railroaders players
Indianapolis Hoosiers (minor league) players
Fort Wayne Chiefs players